Rabbi Nathan Mileikowsky (August 15, 1879 – February 4, 1935) was a Zionist political activist, rabbi, and writer. Mileikowsky's son was the scholar and academic Benzion Netanyahu, and his grandson is current Israeli Prime Minister Benjamin Netanyahu.

Biography 
Mileikowsky was born in 1879 in Kreva, Russian Empire (today located in Belarus), which at that time was part of the Pale of Settlement (region of Imperial Russia in which permanent residency by Jews was allowed) the son of Zvi Mileikowsky and Liba Gitel Halevi. Mileikowsky's father, made a living from leasing an agricultural estate in a nearby village. At the age of 10 Mileikowsky was sent to the Volozhin yeshiva, where he spent eight years and was ordained.

Already while Mileikowsky attended yeshiva he began to make speeches and lectures and was in contact with the Zionist activist Yehuda Zvi Ibzarov who encouraged him to engage in this field. At the age of 20 Mileikowsky began promoting Zionism in the Siberia region, following a request to do so by the Zionist leader Yechiel Chlenov. In the following years Mileikowsky continued to engage in Zionist promotion and in addition gave speeches against the "Bund" movement and against other socialist Jewish anti-Zionist movements. During the Sixth Zionist Congress Mileikowsky was among the opponents of the Uganda Programme, despite belonging to the Theodor Herzl camp.

In 1908 Mileikowsky moved to Poland and became the director of the Hebrew Gymnasium of Mordechai Yaakov Krinsky in Warsaw, while continuing to promote Zionism in Poland. He went through hundreds of towns and was considered one of the most popular Zionist speakers. In 1912 Mileikowsky moved to Łódź, and served as a Maggid in the Zionist synagogue "Beth Jacob". He used to deliver his sermons in Hebrew, an uncommon practice at that time. In 1913 the Hebrew newspaper Ha-Tsefirah reported about a major event held in Lodz organized by the members of the Mizrachi movement. The report mentioned also the "excellent speech" made by Rabbi Mileikowsky, which was carried partly in Hebrew and partly in Yiddish. According to his son, Benzion Netanyahu, the Mileikowsky family was one of the few families in the world who spoke Hebrew at that time. In 1914 Mileikowsky was appointed rabbi of the city Rivne, but following World War I he remained with his family in Lodz.

In 1920, Mileikowsky immigrated to Mandatory Palestine with his wife and nine children, and became the director of the school "Vilkomitz" in Rosh Pina. During this period he published various articles in the Hebrew press promoting the Jewish settlement of the Galilee region. On some of the articles he published he signed under the name "Netanyahu", a surname his sons adopted.

In 1924 he moved with his family to Jerusalem, and during that same year he traveled to England on behalf of Menachem Ussishkin in order to raise funds for the Jewish National Fund and Keren Hayesod. Following the success of these campaigns he was sent to the United States on behalf of the Jewish National Fund. Mileikowsky's numerous speeches made a strong impression on the American Jewish community. In 1926, the newspaper "Dos Yiddishe Folk" reported that the American Zionist Rabbi Mileikowsky lectured in 700 lectures through nine months. Once a year Mileikowsky used to visit Palestine. In 1928 Mileikowsky published several of his speeches in the book Nation and State (Hebrew: עם ומדינה).

On the eve of the 1929 Palestine riots Mileikowsky returned to Palestine, purchased land in Herzliya in which he built up a farm, and in addition he was active in the Hitahdut HaIkarim settlement movement for private farmers.

After the assassination of Haim Arlosoroff in 1933, Rabbi Mileikowsky, who was affiliated with the Revisionist movement, took part in the establishment of a public committee, headed by Rabbi Abraham Isaac Kook, which protected those accused of Arlosoroff's assassination—namely, Zvi Rosenblatt and Abraham Stavsky. Rabbi Mileikowsky argued that the evidence indicated that they did not commit the assassination and that their execution could lead to a civil war, which would harm the Zionist enterprise.

Rabbi Mileikowsky died in Jerusalem on February 4, 1935, and was buried in the Mount of Olives Cemetery. Rabbi Abraham Isaac Kook referred to Mileikowsky in his eulogy as a "divine speaker".

The square most adjacent to Israel's national cemetery in Mount Herzl is named after Nathan Mileikowsky.

Family 
Nathan and his wife Sarah Mileikowsky (née Lurie) had nine children, including: Benzion Netanyahu (the father of Iddo, Yonatan and Benjamin Netanyahu) and Elisha Netanyahu (the husband of Shoshana Netanyahu and the father of Nathan Netanyahu).

References 

1879 births
1935 deaths
Burials at the Jewish cemetery on the Mount of Olives
Israeli people of Belarusian-Jewish descent
Israeli people of Polish-Jewish descent
Israeli political activists
Israeli rabbis
Jewish activists
Jewish educators
Jews in Mandatory Palestine
Netanyahu family
People from Jerusalem
Polish emigrants to Mandatory Palestine
Polish Zionists
Rhetoricians
Writers from Jerusalem